Captain Frank Robison Kerr DSO (5 April 1889 – 3 May 1977) was an Australian rules footballer who played with University in the Victorian Football League (VFL).

An all-round sportsman, Kerr was awarded a Triple Blue at Melbourne University for athletics, cricket and football. In addition to his 40 senior games in the VFL, he also played pennant cricket for four seasons and captained the Melbourne University Athletics Club.

Kerr, who graduated from Melbourne University with a medical degree, was the Victorian selected to be a Rhodes Scholar in 1913. Retired from football, Kerr moved to England and continued his studies at University College.
 
His academic career was interrupted by World War I, during which he spent time in France with Britain's Royal Army Medical Corps. In 1915 he was awarded the Distinguished Service Order (DSO) for showing "conspicuous gallantry and splendid devotion to duty" during fighting in Givenchy, when he twice crawled under the parapet to bring in wounded soldiers, while under fire from the Germans who were within 70 yards.

Kerr completed his studies when he returned to England and practised medicine for three years.

Back in Melbourne, Kerr was appointed Commonwealth Medical Officer in 1925.

References

External links

1889 births
1977 deaths
University Football Club players
Australian Rhodes Scholars
University of Melbourne alumni
Alumni of the University of Oxford
British Army personnel of World War I
Australian Companions of the Distinguished Service Order
Royal Army Medical Corps soldiers
Australian rules footballers from Melbourne
People from Hawthorn, Victoria
Military personnel from Melbourne
Alumni of University College, Oxford
Medical doctors from Melbourne